Azamat Ishenbayev (born 19 June 1978) is a Kyrgyzstani former footballer who played for Dordoi-Dynamo Naryn. He was a member of the Kyrgyzstan national football team.

International goals

Azamat's brothers, Kanat and Maksat, also played football.

References

External links
Player profile – doha-2006.com

1978 births
Living people
Kyrgyzstani footballers
Kyrgyzstan international footballers
Kyrgyzstani Muslims
FC Dinamo Bishkek players
FC Dordoi Bishkek players
Footballers at the 2006 Asian Games
Association football midfielders
Asian Games competitors for Kyrgyzstan